The Jawoyn, also written Djauan, are an Australian Aboriginal people living in the Northern Territory of Australia. The Bagala clan are of the Jawoyn people.

Language
Jawoyn, known as Kumertuo, is a non-Pama–Nyungan language that  belongs to the Macro-Gunwinyguan group of languages of Arnhem land. (It has recently been established that the Gunwinyguan and Pama-Nyungan languages are both branches of a proto-Macro-Pama–Nyungan language.) At one time, Kumertuo was a group of several closely related spoken dialects, but since  resettlement in the post-war period, these dialects have been tending to converge into a single standardized language.

Country
. The Jawoyn call this area Nitmiluk, a name derived from the word nitmi (which refers to the cicada song that Nabilil the crocodile is said to have heard when he set up camp at the entrance to a particular gorge) and the word luk, which means "place". “Nitmiluk” specifically denotes  a 12 kilometre stretch there, consisting of a spectacular chain of chasms and ravines. It has been suggested that the Jawoyn people refers not only to those who speak a Jawoyn language, but also to those who are associated with the landscapes inscribed in the Jawoyn language according to their foundational mythology of the Dreamtime. The language itself, in several varieties was spoken along the Katherine River system as far as the Mainoru River. Their southern limits were around Maranboy, and their western extension came close to Katherine.

Mythology

A widespread belief in Aboriginal thought holds that each language emerged during the formative time of creation when a demiurgic totem figure moved through the landscape crafting it and, simultaneously, endowing each topological feature with its proper word. The creative being changed the language at certain transit points which then were taken as boundary markers between tribes speaking different languages. Thus, in Jawoyn thinking, the landscape of the Katherine Gorge was created in the primordial time (burr) by Nabilil (Crocodile), who named all of the area's distinctive features in the Jawoyn language. He came from the sea, furnished with his firestick (meya) and moved through what became Dagoman and Nangiomeri lands before reaching the gorge.

The Burr Dreamtime also contains other key figures of myth such as Boolong (the Rainbow Serpent) and Barraya (the kookaburra).

History of contact
Many Jawoyn moved to Tandandjal on the ridge affording spring water of a grassy plain 44 miles east-north of Maranboy in November 1948 when a short-lived government settlement for Aborigines had been established. The surrounding hills were thickly forested with lancewoods and eucalypts. While exploring the area in June of that year, 1948, Mr. Ivan Frazer came across a cave littered with stone artifacts, whose walls were adorned with paintings.

Notable people and events
 John Ah Kit
 Ngaree Ah Kit

Bangardi Robert Lee (1952–2005), a leader of the Bagala clan, initiated the Barunga Sport and Cultural Festival in 1985. It became an important forum for sharing ideas, showcasing the Aboriginal Australian and Torres Strait Islander cultures and talent, and to engage with social and political issues. At the 1988 event, the Jaowyn council met with representatives of the Northern and Central Land Councils, Galarrwuy Yunupingu AM and Wenten Rubuntja AM, and the Prime Minister Bob Hawke and Minister for Indigenous Affairs. At the event, Yunupingu and Rubuntja presented Hawke with the Barunga Statement, which asserted the rights of the Indigenous owner-occupiers of Australia.

Seasons

Alternative names

 Adowen
 Charmong
 Chau-an
 Djauun
 Djauwung
 Djawin
 Djawun
 Djouan
 Jawan, Jawony, Kumertuo, according to Ethnologue
 Jawin
 Tjauen
 Tweinbol

Some words
 Bobo. "Goodbye"
 Yowoyn. "Yes", "alright"

Source:

See also
 Edith Falls
 Nitmiluk National Park

Notes

Citations

Sources

Aboriginal peoples of the Northern Territory
Katherine, Northern Territory